Acanthodaphne sabellii is a species of sea snail, a marine gastropod mollusk in the family Raphitomidae.

Description
The length of the shell attains 6.6 mm.

Distribution
This species occurs in the Gulf of Aden.

References

 Bonfitto, A. & Morassi, M. (2006) A new genus of Indo-West Pacific Turridae (Gastropoda: Prosobranchia). Veliger, 48, 136-142. NIZT 682

External links
 Gastropods.com: Acanthodaphne sabellii

sabellii
Gastropods described in 2006